is a masculine Japanese given name.

Possible writings
Takahiro can be written using different kanji characters and can mean:
高広, "high, broad"
隆弘, "noble, vast"
隆宏, "noble, wide"
隆博, "noble, gain"
孝広, "filial piety, broad"
貴大, "precious, big"
貴弘, "precious, vast"
貴裕, "precious, abundant"
貴洋, "precious, ocean"
尭弘, "high, vast"

The name can also be written in hiragana or katakana.

People with the name
Takahiro (敬浩), a vocalist of the Japanese pop music band EXILE
Takahiro Aoh (隆寛), a Japanese professional boxer
Takahiro Arai (貴浩), a Japanese professional baseball player
, Japanese footballer
Takahiro Fujimoto (隆宏), a Japanese medley swimmer
, Japanese baseball player
Takahiro Hōjō (隆博), a Japanese actor and musician
, Japanese actor and voice actor
Takahiro Izutani (タカヒロ), a Japanese composer of video game music and guitarist
 Takahiro Kasuganishiki (孝嘉), a Japanese sumo wrestler
Takahiro Kimura (貴宏), a Japanese animator, illustrator, and character designer
Takahiro Ko (宇洋, born 1998), Japanese footballer
Takahiro Konagawa (高弘), a Japanese guitarist, singer, and musical composer
Takahiro Mahara (孝浩), a Japanese pitcher
Takahiro Matsumae (崇広), a Japanese daimyō of the Edo period
Takahiro "Tak" Matsumoto (孝弘) a guitarist of the Japanese rock band B'z
, Japanese sprinter
Takahiro Mizushima (大宙), a Japanese voice actor
Takahiro Miyashita (隆宏), a former member of the Japanese rock band Anzen Chitai
Takahiro Mori (隆弘), a Japanese medley swimmer
Takahiro Moriuchi (貴寛), a vocalist of the Japanese rock band One Ok Rock
Takahiro Nishijima (隆弘）, a member of the J-pop group AAA
Takahiro Nishikawa (隆宏), a former member of the J-pop band Dreams Come True
Takahiro Ōhashi, Japanese shogi player
, Japanese handball player
Takahiro Sakurai (孝宏, born 1974), a Japanese voice actor
Takahiro Sasaki (disambiguation), multiple people
, Japanese manga artist
, Japanese fencer
, Japanese convicted serial killer. He was dubbed the "Twitter killer" in media
, Japanese basketball player
Takahiro Shoda, (隆弘), a Japanese baseball player
Takahiro Sunada (貴裕), a Japanese marathon runner
Takahiro Suwa (高広), a Japanese professional wrestler
, Japanese footballer
Takahiro Tanaka (disambiguation), multiple people
Takahiro Toyokawa, Japanese shogi player
, Japanese writer
Takahiro Ueno (高広), a Japanese professional drifting driver
, Japanese sprinter
Takahiro Yamada (disambiguation), multiple people
, Japanese footballer
Takahiro Yamamoto (隆弘), a Japanese volleyball player
, Japanese footballer
, Japanese politician
, Japanese classical pianist

Fictional characters 

 Takahiro Hanamaki (花巻 貴大), a character from Haikyu!! with the position of wing spiker from Aoba Johsai High

Japanese masculine given names